Boris Leo Brasol (aka Boris Lvovich Brasol) (or Brazol) (March 31, 1885 - March 19, 1963), lawyer and literary critic, was a White Russian immigrant to the United States.

Biography
Boris Brasol was born in Poltava, Ukraine (then part of Imperial Russia), in 1885. His father was the notable homeopath Lev Evgenevich Brasol (aka Léon Brasol or Léon Brazol) (1854 - January 1927), who was Superintendent of the Petrograd Homoeopathic Hospital in St. Petersburg, Russia. After graduation from the law department of St Petersburg University, Boris served in the Imperial Russian Ministry of Justice, where he took part in the prosecution of the Beilis blood libel case, in which Jewish factory superintendent Menahem Mendel Beilis was accused of ritual murder. In 1912, Brasol was sent to Lausanne to study forensic science.

During World War I, Brasol held the rank of Lieutenant in the Tsar's army. In 1916, he was recalled from the front and sent to the US to work as a lawyer for an Anglo-Russian purchasing committee. After the October Revolution in Russia Brasol stayed in the US as an emigrant.

During his time in the United States, Brasol was an ardent supporter of restoration of the monarchy in Russia, and served as the official representative of Kirill Vladimirovich, Grand Duke of Russia in the United States. He was a founding member of the Russian Imperial Union Order.

Brasol had an extensive publishing career in the United States. He published "Socialism vs. Civilization" (1920), "The World at the Cross Roads" (1921), "The Balance Sheet of Sovietism" (1922), "Elements of Crime" (1927), and "The Mighty Three: Poushkin, Gogol, Dostoievsky" (1934). In 1935, he founded the Pushkin Committee, and from 1937 until 1963 served as President of the Pushkin Society in America.

Several authors link Brasol's name with the first U.S. edition of the  Protocols of the Learned Elders of Zion, which was titled "The Protocols and World Revolution, including a Translation and Analysis of the 'Protocols of the Meetings of the Zionist Men of Wisdom.'" Brasol pursued a successful career as a literary critic and criminologist and published several books in each of these fields.

He is buried in Woodlawn Cemetery, New York.

Some of his papers are preserved in the Library of Congress Manuscript Collection.

Publications
 1920: Socialism vs. Civilization. New York: Charles Scribner's Sons
 1921: The World at the Cross Roads. London, Hutchinson
 1922: The Balance Sheet of Sovietism.  New York, Duffield
 1927: Elements of Crime (Psycho-Social Interpretation). Oxford University Press
 1934: The Mighty Three: Poushkin - Gogol - Dostoievsky. New York: William Farquhar Payson
 1938: Oscar Wilde: the Man, the Artist, the Martyr. New York: Scribner's Sons

Translations
 1949: F. M. Dostoevsky, The Diary of a Writer'', trans. Boris Brasol. New York: Charles Scribner's Sons
 1954: --do.-- New York: George Braziller

Protocols
Anonymous
The Protocols and World Revolution
including a Translation and Analysis of the
"Protocols of the Meetings of the Zionist Men of Wisdom"
(Boston: Small, Maynard & Company, 1920)
A digital copy of the original 1920 text is currently available through Online Books Page: 
.

References

External links
FBI file on Boris Brasol at the Internet Archive

1885 births
1963 deaths
20th-century American biographers
20th-century Russian translators
American male biographers
People from Poltava
People from Poltava Governorate
Protocols of the Elders of Zion
Russian anti-communists
Russian–English translators
Russian military personnel of World War I
Russian monarchists
White Russian emigrants to the United States
Burials at Woodlawn Cemetery (Bronx, New York)
American anti-communists